John Kropke (born January 3, 1966) is a former American football defensive tackle who played nine seasons in the Canadian Football League with the Ottawa Rough Riders, Winnipeg Blue Bombers and Saskatchewan Roughriders. He played college football at Illinois State University.

College career
Kropke played college football for the Illinois State Redbirds. He earned AP Honorable Mention All-American honors in 1987.

Professional career
Kropke played for the Ottawa Rough Riders from 1989 to 1995. He played for the Winnipeg Blue Bombers in 1996. He played for the Saskatchewan Roughriders in 1997, retiring after the season.

Coaching career
Kropke served as linebackers coach of the Eureka Red Devils of Eureka College in 2000 before coaching the defensive line from 2001 to 2004. He was defensive line coach of the Winnipeg Blue Bombers in 2005. He served as defensive line coach of the Montreal Alouettes from 2006 to 2007. Kropke was defensive line coach of the Hamilton Tiger-Cats from 2008 to 2011. He has been assistant defensive line coach of the Chicago Maroons of the University of Chicago since 2012.

References

External links
Just Sports Stats

Living people
1966 births
Players of American football from Chicago
Players of Canadian football from Chicago
American football defensive tackles
Canadian football defensive linemen
American players of Canadian football
Illinois State Redbirds football players
Ottawa Rough Riders players
Winnipeg Blue Bombers players
Saskatchewan Roughriders players
Eureka Red Devils football coaches
Winnipeg Blue Bombers coaches
Montreal Alouettes coaches
Hamilton Tiger-Cats coaches
Chicago Maroons football coaches
Sportspeople from Chicago